Matthiola lunata is a species of plant in the family Brassicaceae.

Sources

References 

lunata
Flora of Malta